The 1916 Droitwich by-election was held on 29 February 1916.  The by-election was held due to the resignation of the incumbent Conservative MP, John Lyttelton.  It was won by the Conservative candidate Herbert Whiteley, who was unopposed.

References

1916 in England
1916 elections in the United Kingdom
By-elections to the Parliament of the United Kingdom in Worcestershire constituencies
Unopposed by-elections to the Parliament of the United Kingdom (need citation)